Kosava Castle is a ruined castellated palace in Gothic Revival style located in Kosava, Belarus. The estate was purchased in 1821 by Count Wojciech Puslowski. After Wojciech Puslowski the estate was inherited by his son Wandalin.  Tadeusz Kościuszko was born in a manor house on the estate. The architect of the castle was Franciszek Jaszczołd. The palace was reconstructed by Władysław Marconi in the late 19th century. After the collapse of the Polish January Uprising in 1863, ownership was transferred to the Trubetskoy family and other Russian aristocrats.

During World War I and World War II, the place was severely damaged. Currently, the castle is in the process of restoration.

Gallery

References 

Ruined castles in Belarus
Gothic Revival architecture in Belarus
1830 establishments in the Russian Empire
Tourist attractions in Brest Region
Buildings and structures in Brest Region
Kosava, Belarus